Marilena from P7 is a medium-length Romanian film, directed by Cristian Nemescu. First released in 2006, it was also nominated the same year for the Semaine de la critique section of the 59th Cannes Film Festival.

Being Cristian Nemescu's last completed project, the film stars Mădălina Ghiţescu as Marilena and Gabriel Huian as Andrei. Originally, the film was intended to be used as an exercise, and was not supposed to be longer than seven minutes. In the end, the project evolved to an unusual length of 45 minutes; the film's approach also turned from comedy to teenage love. Reception from the public was favorable – it impressed through its unitary view and the way the screenplay, picture and sound combine together into a new and organic way, by using innovative, unusual techniques.

Plot
In a suburb of Bucharest, a 13-year-old boy, Andrei (Gabriel Huian), together with some of his friends, watches the prostitutes' show every night from a rooftop and how they are being taken by drivers. The boy falls in love with one of the girls, called Marilena (Mădălina Ghiţescu), and finds out that he needs a decent sum of money in order to approach her. Thus, he steals his father's (Gabriel Spahiu) salary and goes to the prostitutes' meeting place. Marilena's pimp (Andi Vasluianu) is also present, and only agrees to send Marilena and another prostitute with the boy to a nearby pub, where the Rom Elvis is singing (played by the singer Elvis Romano, who translated Elvis Presley's lyrics into his own language). The prostitutes play with Andrei, telling him that he needs a car in order to date them, then they leave. The boy asks Marilena for her phone number, and she writes something in his hand.

Andrei sends a dedication for "Marilena from P7", to the local radio station. The prostitute is in an old man's house, listening to the radio, and the song is Are You Lonesome Tonight?, sung by Elvis Presley.

Among her clients, Marilena falls in love with a man, nicknamed Giani (Cătălin Paraschiv). One night, however, she spots Giani in his car in front of a store, accompanied by another woman, and becomes very discouraged.

Andrei finds a way to get hold of a car and plans to steal his father's trolleybus. He manages to do so, together with his friends. His father sees him and starts following the boys with another driver, his colleague. Arriving at the prostitutes' meeting place, the boys cannot find Marilena. Andrei recognizes Giani's car parked in front of block P7, so he goes in.

Marilena and Giani were in fact in her apartment; the girl goes to the restroom for a minute. Andrei manages to sneak into the apartment, and watches how, while still talking to Giani, Marilena cuts her jugular vein. After realizing what had happened, Giani becomes frightened and runs away; the pimp sees him leaving in a rush, so he goes to the apartment to see what happened. Meanwhile, Andrei goes into the room and looks down at Marilena who is lying down, with blood spilled over her. The news about Marilena's suicide spread fast around the neighborhood.

Cast

Lead roles
 Marilena is played by the Romanian actress Mădălina Ghiţescu (born July 29, 1978), became known to the Bucharest public for the roles she played at the Casandra Theater Studio (Romanian: Studioul de teatru "Casandra") and The Very Small Theater.
 Andrei was played by Gabriel Huian (untrained actor, previously appearing in a video clip that caught the director's attention). He was Cristian Nemescu's preferred choice from the beginning, however a rigorous casting still took place. Apparently attracted to Mădălina Ghiţescu, Huian showed a different attitude than that of other candidates, which only convinced the director further.

Other roles
 Mihai, Andrei's brother played by Cristi Olesher
 Andrei's mother played by Aura Călăraşu
 Andrei's father played by Gabriel Spahiu
 The pimp played by Andi Vasluianu
 Giani played by Cătălin Paraschiv

Production

From project to production
The film's idea resulted from a small scale exercise between Nemescu and Liviu Marghidan when they were in university in 2003. The original idea belonged to Cătălin Mitulescu and Andreei Vălean; the only part of the original story that was kept is that of a group of boys trying to steal a trolleybus in order to get to some prostitutes.

Initially the film was planned as a short fiction, the project evolving during 2005. At the time, Nemescu also had planned what would later become the feature film California Dreamin', impossible to film at that moment, deciding that Marilena from P7 could prove a useful exercise for both director and actors. Thus the screenplay was rewritten and filming started with a very reduced budget of only US $14,000, which was collected by Nemescu by participating at various film festivals, with older short fictions. During development, however, the film received new funds, though still modest ones, thus the actors and a part of the team accepted to work for free.

Filming also took place in 2005, near the marketplace of the Bucharest neighborhood Rahova. The chosen area raised a few difficulties related to safety. However, the production benefited from its picturesque view, rendering the scenography and the original music unnecessary. The omnipresent manele also found their way into the movie, as background music.

For a long period of time the project was entitled Trolley Blues; Cristian Nemescu gave up this title, worrying that there might be a large discrepancy between the equivocal name and the actual, very direct content of the movie.

Post-production
The entire filmmaking process was much more complex than that of most Romanian movies made after 1948. The picture stands out through the use of various effects, such as split-screen, and the use of hand-held filming.

The film's music and sound was also thoroughly post-processed by the project's sound designer, Andrei Toncu, to improve the quality of the recordings, because the budget did not allow for complex equipment to be used, and for creative interest. The movie's background music has reduced volume, following the emotional evolution of the characters—Toncu combining the background music (recorded with, or without intention) and a series of effects characteristic to electronic music and musique concrète. However, a few distinct moments can be observed in the film's music, either composed by Andrei Toncu (Andrei imagining stealing the trolleybus), or already existing recordings, edited so that they would integrate into the movie's atmosphere (Elvis Presley's dedication is dynamically equalized to suggest the shift from one radio to another). Another scene in which multiple layers of sound were used was the radio show heard in Giani's car about the breeding of Memestra brassicae moths.

Reception

Public reception
Marilena from P7 participated at the 59th Cannes Film Festival, along with two other Romanian films  (Cătălin Mitulescu's The Way I Spent the End of the World and Corneliu Porumboiu's 12:08 East of Bucharest) and was nominated for the Semaine de la critique section of the French festival.

 

The Romanian premiere took place on June 4, 2006 at the Transylvania International Film Festival, in Cluj-Napoca. In Bucharest, a first display of the movie was organized on September 8, 2006, in a square established for this purpose on Calea Rahovei Street. The public, as well as the critics from the country, received the movie very well, but the difficulty caused by the movie's unusual duration only allowed for the movie to be on display on a few other occasions. The same problem was encountered when the movie was sent to film festivals outside Romania, being either rejected due to the impossibly of being included in any of the standard categories or included as a short fiction (for example, at Brooklyn).

In the summer of 2006, Nemescu also started the production of California Dreamin'. The filming took place in the June–August interval. By the end of August, the film was nearing its completion; on August 24, 2006, however, Nemescu and Andrei Toncu (sound engineer for the new project as well) died in a car accident in Bucharest. Following the accident, the Romanian public, as well as those from abroad, offered wider attention to the productions of the two cineasts, including Marilena from P7, their first notable success. One year after the accident, the event was commemorated in the country through various displays, public meetings and debates. On August 24, 2007, Marilena from P7 had its premiere at Stockholm during the second Romanian Film Days. Romanian people, from the diaspora, as well as Swedish spectators, were present.

Critical reception
Marilena from P7 was seen by journalists as an attempt to attract attention to various social phenomena (prostitution, the living conditions in low-income Bucharest neighborhoods, etc.), and being presented as a documentary in some scenes. In reality, Nemescu wanted for the public to concentrate on the love story of Andrei:

	

Marilena from P7 also attracted the critics' attention due to its use of explicit verbal and visual content. Cristian Nemescu said that this kind of scenes were a necessarily element for the realism of the movie, declaring himself a partisan of explicit content.

The film continues to be appreciated for its experimental nature, its camera angles and montage elements being treated in an unusual manner, while the fiction elements of the screenplay hint of magic realism. In this sense, it is important to mention that the days in the film are separated by Andrei's erotic dreams. In his dreams, the differences between him and Marilena are partially removed, either by lowering the rooftop on which the boy stands to ground level or by debarking the girl from a breast-shaped UFO that scares the neighbors away. Another fictional element is Marilena's capacity of provoking short circuits, in moments in which she is very emotionally active (e.g., when Andrei touches her in the bar's restroom, or when the whole neighborhood is cut from electricity when she cries near the high voltage electrical box).

Awards and nominations
The following list includes the most notable nominations and awards the film received.

Further reading
 Article originally published in the "Eva" magazine, a dialogue between Greta Harja, Nemescu and Mădălina Ghiţescu before the Cannes Festival
 Interview by Mădălina Ghiţescu with Paul S. Odhan

See also
 Romanian New Wave

References and footnotes

External links
 
 Movie profile on Cinemagia
 Movie profile on PORT.ro
 Movie profile on Allmovie
 Movie poster (with text)
 Photo gallery (photographs from the film and the shooting), hosted by OutNow.ch

Romanian fantasy drama films
2006 films
Films directed by Cristian Nemescu